Bradyrhizobium valentinum is a bacterium from the genus Bradyrhizobium which has been isolated from the nodules of the plant Lupinus mariae-josephae in Spain.

References

Nitrobacteraceae
Bacteria described in 2014